At least three hired armed cutters named Duchess of Cumberland have served the Royal Navy.

First Duchess of Cumberland
The  first Duchess of Cumberland served in 1783.

Second Duchess of Cumberland
The  second Duchess of Cumberland was a cutter of eight guns and 65  tons burthen (bm). She served from 2 April 1793 to 27 October 1800.

Third Duchess of Cumberland
The  third Duchess of Cumberland was a cutter of six 3-pounder guns and 65  tons burthen (bm). She served from 17 June 1803 to 5 January 1805. Her owner was Henshaw Latham and she had a crew of 23 men. Latham received £2008 for her hire. She was under the command of Lieutenant John Sibrell (or Sybrille).

Citations and references
Citations

References

Hired armed vessels of the Royal Navy